Bremerhaven Hauptbahnhof is a railway station in the city of Bremerhaven in northwestern Germany. It is the main railway hub for the city, offering regional connections to Bremen, Osnabrück, Cuxhaven, Bremervörde and Buxtehude. Museal services on the line to Bad Bederkesa also call at the station during weekends in summer.

History 

First plans to build a railway link between Bremerhaven and Bremen were laid out as early as the 1850s.  From 1859 to 1862, a line was built with a terminal station at Geestemünde (now a borough of Bremerhaven).  In 1896, the railway line to Cuxhaven was built, also connecting to the terminus station.  Due to an increase in traffic, it was decided to abandon the old station and build a new one, because the old one, connected with single-track, can't be increased, and on July 1, 1914, the new station, then called Geestemünde-Bremerhaven, was opened together with a new, grade-separated line to Lehe and Cuxhaven.

When Geestemünde and Lehe were merged to form Wesermünde in 1924, the station was renamed to Wesermünde-Bremerhaven.  The station building survived World War II, but the station hall was pulled down in the early 70's - having survived the railway electrification in 1966.  The station name changed again when Wesermünde was renamed to Bremerhaven in 1947, and the station became known as Bremerhaven Hauptbahnhof. Due to the US Army barracks in Bremerhaven, there were also regular military train services, as well as official duty trains to Berlin during the Cold War.

From the mid-1990s to 2000, there used to be a daily InterCityExpress service to Munich, leaving Bremerhaven in the morning and arriving in the evening.  This service was abandoned, leaving the station without long-distance services ever since.

Renovation plans 
Deutsche Bahn, along with the city government, have laid out plans to renovate the station. Renovation will include remodeling the platforms, raising them to improve accessibility, as well as removing one of the two staircases per platform and replacing them with a lift. The station subway will also be renovated, as will the entrance hall. Renovation is estimated to be finished by 2009 and first was budgeted at € 8.2 million, of which the state Free Hanseatic City of Bremen was supposed to pay 3.8 million. With this budget, it would not have been possible to fully restore the station hall, however, and lobbyist groups have called for additional funding to allow the removal of the hall's current low ceiling.  After negotiations, the Deutsche Bahn announced to rise its share of the €8.2 million fund to €800,000 on the condition that the city of Bremerhaven would pay €600,000 to allow for the renovation of the entrance hall.  The planned shortening of the station platforms to 210 metres is regarded as controversial, as city officials fear this will cut the station off the long-distance network indefinitely.  DB, however, has claimed that even with a 210 m platform, a single ICE 2 unit could still call at the station, as these units are 205 metres long.

Train services
The following services currently call at the station:

Regional services  Bremerhaven-Lehe - Bremen - Nienburg - Hanover
Regional services  Bremerhaven-Lehe - Bremen - Osnabrück
Local services  Buxtehude - Bremervörde - Bremerhaven - Dorum - Cuxhaven
Bremen S-Bahn services  Bremerhaven-Lehe - Osterholz-Scharmbeck - Bremen - Twistringen

Operational usage 
Services operated by DB Regio, EVB and Bremen S-Bahn call at the station.  It is also frequently passed by freight trains to and from the Bremerhaven seaport, a special through track exists for these trains.  There are to RegionalExpress connections to Osnabrück Hbf and Hannover Hbf via Bremen Hbf, served by modern double decker trains.  The other connections are local only, operated by the Bremen S-Bahn and by the EVB using DMUs, as the lines to Buxtehude and Cuxhaven are not electrified.  The next station to the north is Bremerhaven-Lehe, the next station to the south is Bremerhaven-Wulsdorf.

See also
List of railway stations in Bremen

References

External links 

 Additional information on U.S. military train Bremerhaven-Berlin.

Railway stations in Bremen (state)
Hauptbahnhof
Bremen S-Bahn
Railway stations in Germany opened in 1914